Diamond Eyes is an album by the Deftones.

Diamond Eyes may also refer to:

 "Diamond Eyes" (song), the title song from the album Diamond Eyes
 "Diamond Eyes (Boom-Lay Boom-Lay Boom)", a song by Shinedown
"Diamond Eyes", a song by Eddie Benjamin and Sia from the EP Emotional
 Diamond Eyes: The Series, a Thai film series
 Diamond Eyes, an electronic music producer signed with NoCopyrightSounds